The Athabasca River (French: Rivière Athabasca) is a river in Alberta, Canada, which originates at the Columbia Icefield in Jasper National Park and flows more than  before emptying into Lake Athabasca. Much of the land along its banks is protected in national and provincial parks, and the river is designated a Canadian Heritage River for its historical and cultural importance.

Etymology
The name Athabasca comes from the Woods Cree word   , which means "[where] there are plants one after another", likely a reference to the spotty vegetation along the river.

Course
It travels  before draining into the Peace-Athabasca Delta near Lake Athabasca south of Fort Chipewyan. From there, its waters flow north as Rivière des Rochers, then join the Peace River to form the Slave River, which empties into the Great Slave Lake and discharges through the Mackenzie River system into the Arctic Ocean.

The river flows along icefields and through gorges, offering wildlife habitat on its shores and in adjacent marshes. Throughout its course, it flows through or adjacent to numerous national and provincial parks, including Jasper National Park, Fort Assiniboine Sandhills Wildland Provincial Park, Hubert Lake Wildland Provincial Park, La Biche River Wildland Provincial Park, Grand Rapids Wildland Provincial Park, Richardson Wildland Provincial Park, and Wood Buffalo National Park. Its course is marked by rapids, impeding navigation southwest of Fort McMurray.

Numerous communities are located on the banks of the Athabasca River, including Jasper, Brule, Entrance, Hinton, Whitecourt, Fort Assiniboine, Smith, Athabasca, Fort McMurray, and Fort McKay.

Tributaries

Alberta's Rockies
Habel Creek
Warwick Creek
Quincy Creek
Chaba River
Dragon Creek
Sunwapta River
Ranger Creek
Fryatt Creek
Lick Creek
Geraldine Lakes
Kerkeslin Creek
Hardisty Creek
Whirlpool River
Astoria River
Portal Creek
Wabasso Creek
Whistlers Creek
Tekerra Creek
Miette River
Pyramid Lake
Maligne River
Garonne Creek
Snaring River
Morro Creek
Cobblestone Creek
Corral Creek
Jacques Creek
Rocky River
Snake Indian River
Mountain Creek
Fiddle River
Supply Creek
Oldhouse Creek
Prine Creek
Maskuta Creek

Central Alberta
Hardisty Creek
Fish Creek
Cache Petotte Creek
Tiecamp Creek
Canyon Creek
Ponoka Creek
Plante Creek
Apetowun Creek
Obed Creek
Oldman Creek
Nosehill Creek
Jackpine Creek
Berland River
Wildhay River
Beaver Creek
Marsh Head Creek
Pine Creek
Pass Creek
Two Creek
Windfall Creek
Chickadee Creek
Bessie Creek
Stony Creek
Sakwatamau River
McLeod River

Northern Alberta
Freeman River
Timeu Creek
Pembina River
Lesser Slave River
Lawrence Lake Creek
Baptiste Lake Creek
Tawatinaw River
La Biche River
Calling River
McMillan Lake Creek
Parallel Creek
Pelican River
House River
Horse River
Clearwater River
Steepbank River
Muskeg River
Mackay River
Ells River
Firebag River
Richardson River

History

Sekani, Shuswap, Kootenay, Salish, Stoney, and Cree tribes hunted and fished along the river prior to European colonization in the 18th century. From about 1778, the Athabasca River, the Clearwater River, which enters the Athabasca River from the east at Fort McMurray, and the Methye Portage were part of a primary fur trade route from the Mackenzie River to the Great Lakes (see Canadian Canoe Routes (early)).
David Thompson and Thomas the Iroquois traveled through Athabasca Pass in 1811. In 1862, the Athabasca Springs area was crossed during the Cariboo Gold Rush by the Overlander Party.

The northern segment of the Athabasca River became part of a major shipping network in 1921 when the Alberta and Great Waterways Railway reached Waterways near Fort McMurray, making it the northernmost point on the North American railroad grid at that time. Cargo for destinations farther north was shipped to Waterways and transferred to barges, after which fleets of tugboats took them up the river to destinations in the Athabasca and Mackenzie River watersheds. Barge traffic declined after 1964 when Hay River, on the Great Slave Lake in the Northwest Territories, became the northern terminus of the rail grid.

Environmental concerns
Owing to its proximity to the Athabasca oil sands, the river has seen significant amounts of energy infrastructure constructed along its course. On June 6, 1970, a pipeline operated by Great Canadian Oil Sands, the precursor to Suncor and the earliest commercial extraction operation, ruptured near the banks of the river.

In 2012, an independent study concluded that the Athabasca River contained elevated levels of pollution downstream of the Athabasca oil sands. Testing showed this portion of the river contained mercury, lead, and 11 other toxic elements.

In 2021, another independent research was conducted on the streamflow and climate data sets for the Athabasca River Basin showing the seasonality of the streamflow and precipitation time series via wavelet analysis. The seasonal components of these time series were shown to be coherent with phase discrepancy. The mean temperature had been gradually increasing since 1960, and it was projected to increase by approximately 2 °C during the mid-century, possibly reducing the snowpack volume during the spring.

Coal mine spill
On October31, 2013, a pit at the Obed Mountain coal mine spilled, and between 600 million and a billion litres of slurry poured into Plante and Apetowun Creeks.

Heritage
The river was designated a Canadian heritage river for its importance to the fur trade and the construction of railways and roads opening up the Canadian West, as well as for its natural heritage. 

The Canadian Heraldic Authority named the position of Athabaska Herald after the river.

Gallery

See also
Geography of Alberta
List of Alberta rivers
List of longest rivers of Canada

References

External links
 http://www.environment.alberta.ca/apps/OSEM/ Athabasca River Conditions and Use, Government of Alberta
 http://www.ramp-alberta.org/river.aspx Alberta Environmental Monitoring, Evaluation and Reporting Agency, RAMP (Regional Aquatics Monitoring Program), Athabasca River Basin
 https://web.archive.org/web/20120414210651/http://www.chrs.ca/Rivers/Athabasca/Athabasca-F_e.php Canadian Heritage Rivers System (CHRS), Athabasca River
 http://arbri.athabascau.ca/About-the-Athabasca-River-basin/Index.php About the Athabasca River Basin, Athabasca River Basin Research Institute
 

Athabasca, Alberta
Canadian Heritage Rivers
Fort McMurray
Jasper National Park
Rivers of Alberta
Whitecourt
Rivers of the Canadian Rockies
River, Athabasca